Will Mallory (born June 22, 1999) is an American football tight end for the Miami Hurricanes.

Early life and high school
Mallory grew up in Jacksonville, Florida and attended the Providence School. He caught 46 passes for 900 yards and 12 touchdowns as a junior. Mallory missed multiple games due to injury as a senior and finished the season with 21 catches for 364 yards and three touchdowns. Mallory was rated a four-star recruit and committed to play college football at Miami over offers from Georgia, Michigan, Clemson, Alabama, Auburn, Florida, Louisville, Notre Dame, Ohio State, and USC.

College career
Mallory played in ten games for the Miami Hurricanes as a freshman and caught five passes for 37 yards. He played in all 13 of the team's games with eight starts during his sophomore season and finished the year with 16 receptions for 293 yards with two touchdowns. Mallory caught 22 passes for 329 yards with four touchdowns as a junior. He finished the 2021 season with 30 receptions for 347 yards and four touchdowns. Mallory considered declaring for the 2021 NFL Draft, but opted to use the extra year of eligibility granted to college athletes in 2020 due to the COVID-19 pandemic and returned to Miami for a fifth season.

Personal life
Mallory's father, Mike Mallory, is a longtime football coach who is currently the assistant special teams coach for the Denver Broncos. His grandfather, Bill Mallory, served as the head football coach at Miami of Ohio, Colorado, Northern Illinois, and Indiana. Mallory's two uncles, Curt Mallory and Doug Mallory, are also football coaches.

References

External links
Miami Hurricanes bio

Living people
American football tight ends
Miami Hurricanes football players
Players of American football from Jacksonville, Florida
1999 births